Aequatorium repandiforme is a species of flowering plant in the family Asteraceae that is found only in Ecuador.
Its natural habitat is subtropical or tropical moist montane forests, and the plant is threatened by habitat loss.

References

repandiforme
Flora of Ecuador
Near threatened plants
Taxonomy articles created by Polbot